Edward Thornborough, DD (b Middlesex 1587; d Worcester 1645)was a 17th-century English priest.

The son of Bishop John Thornborough, he was educated at Merton College, Oxford. Thornborough held livings at Witchampton, Ower Moigne and Turnerspuddle; and was archdeacon of Worcester from 1629 until his death.

References

Alumni of Merton College, Oxford
Archdeacons of Worcester
17th-century English Anglican priests
People from Middlesex
1587 births
1645 deaths